Dallas Semiconductor, acquired by Maxim Integrated in 2002 for $2.5 billion, was a company that designed and manufactured analog, digital, and mixed-signal semiconductors (integrated circuits, or ICs). Its specialties included communications products (including T/E and Ethernet products), microcontrollers, battery management, thermal sensing and thermal management, non-volatile random-access memory, microprocessor supervisors, delay lines, silicon oscillators, digital potentiometers, real-time clocks, temperature-compensated crystal oscillators (TCXOs), iButton, and 1-Wire products.

History 
The company, based in Dallas, Texas, was founded in 1984 and purchased by Maxim Integrated Products in 2001.  Both the Maxim and Dallas Semiconductor brands were actively used until 2007.  Since then, the Maxim name has been used for all new products, though the Dallas Semiconductor brand has been retained for some older products, which can be identified by "DS" at the beginning of their part numbers, for example the 1-Wire communications protocol devices. 

Notable products by the company included the DS80-series microcontrollers with 8051 instruction set. As of June 2021, devices are still under active production by Maxim Integrated.

References

External links

 
 Vin Prothro (CEO & founder)

Semiconductor companies of the United States
Manufacturing companies based in Dallas
American companies established in 1984
Computer companies established in 1984
Electronics companies established in 1984
Manufacturing companies established in 1984
Defunct manufacturing companies based in Texas